Lorraine Kuhler (born 1990) is an English international lawn and indoor bowler.

Bowls career
Kuhler is a National triples champion (2014) and three times winner of the National Junior Pairs at the Bowls England National Championships when bowling for Worthing Pavilion and Sussex. In 2011, she won two medals at the European Bowls Championships in Portugal.

In 2019, she won the gold medal at the Atlantic Bowls Championships and in 2020 she was selected for the 2020 World Outdoor Bowls Championship in Australia.

References

English female bowls players
Living people
1990 births